Kim Jin-seong, or Kim Jin-sung a Korean name consisting of the family name Kim and the masculine given name Jin-seong, may refer to:

 Kim Jin-seong (actor)
 Kim Jin-sung (baseball)
 Kim Jin-sung (footballer, born 1999)
 Kim Jin-sung (footballer, born 1997)